Sylvester Ayodele Arise is a Nigerian senator who represents the People's Democratic Party (PDP) in Ekiti State. He became a member of the Nigerian Senate in  2007.

Background

Ayodele Arise was born on 5 October 1956.  His father was a judge.  He was Assistant General Secretary of the Students Union at Ibadan Polytechnic (1976–1977). He obtained an M.Sc Urban & Regional Planning from Alabama A&M University, Normal, Alabama USA in 1984. and is an A+ Certified Computer Engineer, Microsoft Certified Professional.

After teaching mathematics and then working as a  town planner, he entered into business in 1981 buying and selling video players and tapes in Nigeria. In the United States, he established a Computer Training Institute. In 2000 he launched Cards Technology Limited, a company that built the first Third Party Processing Facility in sub- 
 sahara Africa for MasterCard International. This paved the way for the issuance of MasterCard by banks in Nigeria to their customers thereby opening up the opportunity for Nigerians to participate in ecommerce as we know it today.</ref> He also launched Fortune Games Limited for SMS Lottery.

Senate career

Ayodele Arise was elected to the National Senate for the Ekiti North constituency in 2007 and was appointed as the Chairman Senate Committee on Privatization and member of other committees including Local and Foreign Debts, Water, Banking, Insurance & Other Financial Institutions.

In July 2009 a court upheld the verdict of the Ekiti State Election Petitions Tribunal, which voided Arise's election after a petition had been filed by the Action Congress candidate, Mr. Olubunmi Adetunmbi, who alleged substantial non-compliance with the Electoral Act 2006.

References

Living people
People from Ekiti State
1956 births
Peoples Democratic Party members of the Senate (Nigeria)
Yoruba politicians
The Polytechnic, Ibadan alumni
Nigerian expatriates in the United States
21st-century Nigerian politicians